Eurofighter is the Eurofighter Typhoon, a model of jet fighter.

Eurofighter or Eurofighter Typhoon may also refer to:

Roller coasters
 Gerstlauer Euro-Fighter, a model of roller coaster built by Gerstlauer Amusement Rides
 Eurofighter (Zoosafari Fasanolandia), a Gerstlauer Euro-Fighter model roller coaster at Zoosafari Fasanolandia amusement park and zoo, Italy
 Typhoon (Bobbejaanland), a Gerstlauer Euro-Fighter model roller coaster at Bobbejaanland amusement park, Belgium

Other uses
 Eurofighter GmbH, a multinational company that coordinates the design, production and upgrade of the Eurofighter Typhoon
 EF2000 (video game), a combat flight simulation game published by Ocean Software
 Eurofighter Typhoon (video game), a combat flight simulation game published by Rage Software